Scabiosa ochroleuca, commonly called cream pincushions or cream scabious, is a species of scabious with creamy yellow flower heads.  It is native to  Europe and western Asia.

References

ochroleuca
Plants described in 1753
Taxa named by Carl Linnaeus